"The Word" is a song by English rock band the Beatles, written by John Lennon and Paul McCartney and recorded with Lennon on lead vocals. It was first released on their 1965 album Rubber Soul.

Composition
The song was co-written by John Lennon and Paul McCartney. According to Lennon, it was written together but it was "mainly mine".

Music
Musically, the song is founded on a driving funk beat, with few chord changes and a simple melody in the key of D major. (The refrain is a 12 bar blues in D. The main chord is D7(9), also used in "Drive My Car" and "Taxman".)

Paul McCartney said of this song, "John and I would like to do songs with just one note like 'Long Tall Sally'. We get near it in 'The Word'".

Reception
In his review for the 50th anniversary of Rubber Soul, Jacob Albano of Classic Rock Review writes that "The Word" is the first song on its parent album not to be "absolutely excellent," calling the harmonies "a bit too forced." However, Albano still considered the song "entertaining", and complimented the "piano backdrop" and Starr's drum performance.

In 2018, the music staff of Time Out London ranked "The Word" at number 33 on their list of the best Beatles songs.

Personnel
According to Walter Everett, except where noted:

The Beatles
 John Lennon lead vocal, rhythm guitar
 Paul McCartney falsetto and double-tracked backing vocals, bass, piano
 George Harrison double-tracked backing vocal, lead guitar
 Ringo Starr drums, maracas

Additional musician
 George Martin harmonium

Notes

References

Sources

External links

The Beatles songs
Song recordings produced by George Martin
Songs written by Lennon–McCartney
1965 songs
Songs published by Northern Songs